Deceit (Italian: Inganno) is a 1952 Italian melodrama film directed by Guido Brignone and starring Gabriele Ferzetti, Nadia Gray and Tina Lattanzi. The film's sets were designed by the art director Piero Filippone. It was partly shot on location around Trieste.

Plot 
Anna is a policewoman, member of the female section of the Civil Police of the Free Territory of Trieste, she marries Andrea, a doctor with an unclear past but already during the honeymoon begins to have doubts especially after the chance meeting with a former lover of his. Back at work Anna has to investigate this adventurer who seems to be involved not only in drug trafficking but also in the white trade.

Andrea is also involved in the investigation and is suspected of complicity, for this reason Anna decides to separate. Andrea, having failed every attempt to reconcile her, wants to go abroad and also asks for help from her ex-lover but then refuses to collaborate with her precisely because he does not want his wife's suspicions to become certainties.

Meanwhile, Anna discovers she is pregnant and she would like to leave the police to form a family with Andrea but the man is killed by the mother of a girl who underwent an abortion and then died.

Cast
 Gabriele Ferzetti as Andrea Vannini
 Nadia Gray as Anna Comin 
 Tina Lattanzi as Ispettrice di polizia Rosasco
 Bice Valori as Giustine
 Lia Orlandini as  Signora Comin
 Bianca Doria as Signora Casardi
 Wilma Pagis as Baronessa Monica d'Erlange 
 Giovanna Galletti as  Marta
 Mirko Ellis as Commissario Costa 
 Leo Garavaglia as Matteo Casardi 
 Tina Pica as  Cecchia inferma
 Bruna Corrà as	Silvia
 Heinz Moog as Rassuna, complice della baronessa
 Pietro Tordi as L'altro complice della baronessa
 Rosita Pisano as La signora litigiosa
 Italia Marchesini as 	Signora Bedini
 Carlo Giuffrè as 	Un corteggiatore di Giustina
 Renato Malavasi as 	Il cameriere dell'hotel
 Mario Castellani as 	Ubriaco al night-club
 Maria Zanoli as 	La padrona della pensione
 Mimmo Palmara as 	Un uomo in canottiera
 Michele Malaspina as 	Il sovrinntendente della polizia
 Vittorio Kramer as 	Tenente della finanza
 Lili Cerasoli as Luisa, la ragazza morente per aborto
 Rossana Galli as Ragazza alla festa
 Pietro Carloni as Un commissario di polizia
 Mimmo Poli as Un cliente della trattoria

References

Bibliography 
 Chiti, Roberto & Poppi, Roberto. Dizionario del cinema italiano: Dal 1945 al 1959. Gremese Editore, 1991.

External links
 

1952 films
1950s Italian-language films
Films directed by Guido Brignone
Italian drama films
1952 drama films
Melodrama films
Italian black-and-white films
1950s Italian films